John D'Or Prairie is a First Nations settlement within the John D'Or Prairie 215 Indian reserve in northern Alberta, Canada. It is located on the Lawrence River, upstream from the Peace River, and south of the Caribou Mountains.

The settlement is located in census division No. 17 and in the federal riding of Peace River. The settlement and the Indian reserve are part of the Little Red River Cree Nation.

Access 
The settlement is accessed by the John D'Or Prairie Aerodrome and an access road that connects to Alberta Highway 58 to the north of the Indian reserve.

Demographics 
Statistics Canada has not recently published a population for John D’Or Prairie. However, the population of John D'Or Prairie according to the Little Red River Cree Nation is 1,062.

See also 
List of communities in Alberta
List of Indian reserves in Alberta

References

External links 
 Little Red River Board of Education: John D'Or Prairie School website
 Little Red River Cree Nation: Community
 Aboriginal Communities: Alberta: John D'Or Prairie 215

Localities on Indian reserves in Alberta